Dhalua is a union, the smallest administrative body of Bangladesh, located in Nangalkot Upazila, Comilla District, Bangladesh. The total population is 27557.

References

Unions of Nangalkot Upazila